Hospicio de San José is a Roman Catholic welfare institution in the City of Manila, the Philippines. It is the first social welfare agency in the country, and as a foster care institution has been a home for orphans, the abandoned, special needs, and the elderly.

Location

Hospicio de San José is located on Isla de Convalecencia (Spanish, "Island of convalescence"), an eyot in the middle of the Pasig River, and can only be accessed via Ayala Bridge. It was formerly located in the Pandacan district. From there, it was transferred to Intramuros, Binondo, Nagtahan, and Echague.  In 1810, the Hospicio was permanently relocated to Isla de Convalecencia.

History

Initially named the Hospicio General (General Hospice), Hospicio de San José was established during the Spanish Era in October 1778 by Don Francisco Gómez Enríquez and his wife Doña Barbara Verzosa.  After being cured of a fever, Don Gómez Enríquez donated the sum of ₱ 4,000 to found the hospice that would take care of Manila’s “poor and unwanted children”, the physically and mentally disabled, and aging people. The initiative and example of Don Gómez Enríquez was followed by other charitable people of Manila.

Administrators
From December 27, 1810, and by Royal Decree, the hospice was governed by a Board of Directors chaired by the Archbishop of Manila. On June 1, 1866, through the suggestion to the Governor-General of the Philippines by a benefactor named Doña Margarita Róxas, the operation of the hospice became the responsibility of the Daughters of Charity of St. Vincent de Paul.

Curriculum and programmes
The hospice provides an outreach programme and a Christian, social and work-oriented formation programme. It is committed to assisting abandoned people to experience quality life with the aim of making them “agents of social transformation”.

Present Condition

The Hospicio de San José has two historical markers. The first, in  English, was from the Historical Research and Markers Committee and was unveiled on October 17, 1939. In 1977, a second historical marker in Tagalog was given by the National Historical Institute.

1939 Marker
The first historical marker of Hospicio de San José was installed in October 17, 1939, at Ayala Boulevard, San Miguel, Manila. It was installed by Historical Research and Markers Committee.

1977 Marker
The second historical marker was installed in 1977 at Hospicio de San José, San Miguel, Manila. It was installed by National Historical Institute.

See also
 Asilo de San Vicente de Paul

References

External links
Hospicio de San Jose (Australian Fundraising Site)

Orphanages in the Philippines
1778 establishments in Asia
Health in Metro Manila
Buildings and structures in San Miguel, Manila
Cultural Properties of the Philippines in Metro Manila
Spanish colonial infrastructure in the Philippines